Ana Paula Arósio (born 16 July 1975) is a Brazilian former actress and model. She lives in Swindon, Wiltshire, England since 2015.

Career
Arósio is one of the most popular actresses in Brazil. She started her career at the age of twelve when Ana Paula was "discovered" by a representative for an advertisement agency while shopping at a supermarket. Her first work was done with the Brazilian agency Stilo, along with Brazilian photographer Paulo Sadao. In 1989, Arósio moved to Japan to work as a model.

After appearing in hundreds of magazine covers and television commercials, she began her career as an actress. Her first job as an actress was as Berenice in the Italian-Brazilian film Forever, directed by Walter Hugo Khouri. She made her debut in television with Éramos Seis (We Were Six), a telenovela in which she played Amanda. Éramos Seis, along with her next two telenovela appearances were all on the Brazilian television network SBT. The three productions, starting in 1994, were the aforementioned telenovela, Razão de Viver (Reason to Live), and Os Ossos do Barão (The Baron's Bones).

Stardom in Brazil came about in 1998, when Arósio played the protagonist role in Hilda Furacão (Hilda Hurricane). Hilda Furacão was a miniseries on the Brazilian television network Rede Globo written by Glória Perez. The miniseries explores the life of a young prostitute in the 1950s Brazil.

After her success in Hilda Furacão, she took on the protagonist roles in two more telenovelas with Rede Globo: Terra Nostra and Esperança, both by author Benedito Ruy Barbosa and with a focus on Italian immigration to Brazil. Terra Nostra gained Arósio international renown in 1999. A telenovela about the Italian immigration to Brazil, Terra Nostra is a love story between two immigrants set amidst the wave of Italian immigration to Brazil between the end of the 19th century and the beginning of the 20th century. She was the main actress in the role of the Italian immigrant Giuliana Esplendore. Arósio herself is of Italian descent, with great-grandparents from Lombardy. Terra Nostra was broadcast in 95 countries, one of the most successful productions of Rede Globo.

Other than these, she has made diverse special appearances in television, as well as other miniseries, while working on her theater career. Her most well-known theater piece was Casa de Bonecas (House of Dolls) in 2002. Besides Casa de Bonecas, Ana Paula starred in four other plays: Diário Secreto de Adão e Eva (The Secret Diary of Adam and Eve), Harmonia em Negro (Harmony in Black), Fedra (Phedra), and Batom (Lipstick).

In 2004, Ana Paula won the best supporting actress award for the film Celeste & Estrela, directed by Betse de Paula, in the 3rd Film Festival of Varginha.

In 2005, she acted in the Brazilian film O Coronel e o Lobisomem, directed by Maurício Farias, alongside Brazilian actors Selton Mello e Diogo Vilela. Her first telenovela set in present-day was Páginas da Vida (Pages of Life) in 2006, written by Manoel Carlos. Up until this point, she had only worked on period pieces.

In 2007, Ana Paula was chosen as the new face for Avon. In 2008, Ana Paula once again starred in another period piece, the telenovela Ciranda de Pedra, an adaptation from the 1981 novel.

Arósio won the Troféu Imprensa three times. The Troféu Imprensa is considered the greatest annual award for the biggest stand outs in Brazilian television in several categories. She won the award in the category of "Revelation of the Year" for Hilda in Hilda Furacão in 1998, and in the category na categoria of Best Actress for Giuliana in Terra Nostra and for Judge Camille in Esperança in 2002.

In October 2010, tipped to star in the telenovela Insensato Coração, Arósio, according to Rede Globo, she missed the first recordings, didn't report to work, and was terminated from the show's production. On 20 December the same year, the actress resigned Globo and terminated the contract, which was made public on January 12, 2011.

Filmography

Television
Éramos Seis (We Were Six) (1994), Amanda
Razão de Viver (Reason of Living) (1996), Bruna
Os Ossos do Barão (The Baron's Bones) (1997), Isabel
Hilda Furacão (Hilda Hurricane) (1998), Hilda Furacão
Mulher (Woman) (1998)
Você Decide (You Decide) (1998), Lena
Terra Nostra (Our Land) (1999), Giuliana
Os Maias (The Maias) (2001), Maria Eduarda da Maia
Brava Gente (Brave People) (2001), Madalena
Os Normais (The Normals) (2001), Carminha
Esperança (Hope) (2002), Camille
Celebridade (Celebrity) (2003), Alice - special participation
Um Só Coração (One Lonely Heart) (2004), Yolanda Penteado
Mad Maria (2005), Consuelo
Páginas da Vida (Pages of Life) (2006), Olívia
Ciranda de Pedra (Ring of Rocks) (2008), Laura Toledo
Na Forma da Lei (2010), Ana Beatriz

Film
Per Sempre (Forever) (1991), Berenice
Os Cristais debaixo do trono (The Cristals Beneath the Throne) (2001)
Celeste e Estrela (Celeste and Estrela) (2005), airport receptionist
O Coronel e o Lobisomem (The Colonel and the Werewolf) (2005), Cousin Esmeraldina
Como Esquecer (2010), Júlia
Anita e Garibaldi (2013), Anita Garibaldi
A Floresta Que Se Move (2015)

Theater
Casa de Bonecas (House of Dolls) (2002), Nora Helmer
Diário Secreto de Adão e Eva (The Secret Diary of Adam and Eve)
Harmonia em Negro (Harmony in Black)
Fedra (Phedra)
Batom (Lipstick)

Awards & Nominations

References

External links

 Hilda Furacão
 Ego - Ana Paula Arósio
 Memória Globo - Ana Paula Arósio
AN Tevê - Heroína de lenços a postos: aos 26 anos, Ana Paula Arósio emplaca terceiro papel dramático

1975 births
Living people
Actresses from São Paulo
Brazilian people of Italian descent
Brazilian female models
Brazilian television actresses
20th-century Brazilian actresses
21st-century Brazilian actresses
Brazilian emigrants to England
Actors from Swindon